Steeton with Eastburn is a civil parish in the metropolitan borough of the City of Bradford, West Yorkshire, England.  It contains 25 listed buildings that are recorded in the National Heritage List for England.  All the listed buildings are designated at Grade II, the lowest of the three grades, which is applied to "buildings of national importance and special interest".  The parish contains the villages of Steeton and Eastburn and the surrounding area.  Most of the listed buildings are houses, cottages and associated structures, farmhouses and farm buildings.  The other listed buildings include a church, a Sunday school, a road bridge, a former textile mill, three milestones, a commemorative tower, and a pillbox and two fire posts surviving from the Second World War.


Buildings

References

Citations

Sources

 

Lists of listed buildings in West Yorkshire